Squad Wars is an American comedy streaming television series produced exclusively for YouTube Red, featuring The Try Guys and other Internet personalities. The series premiered on January 26, 2017. The season finale was released on March 23, 2017. The 9 episodes, 25-minute-long series is produced by Buzzfeed Motion Pictures.

The competition reality series features new teams and new challenges.

Episodes

Season 1

References

External links

2017 web series debuts
YouTube Premium original series